The Hobie Magic 25 is a trailable, strict one-design monohull sportsboat that was manufactured by the Hobie Cat Company (USA), Bashford Boatbuilder (Australia) and Lidgard Boatbuilder (New Zealand) for racing and day sailing in the late 1990s.

Structure

The Hobie Magic 25 is currently out of production with about 75 boats in total being built, with the majority produced by Bashford Boatbuilder in Nowra, Australia.

Design

Designed for Hobie by Australian designer Iain Murray and Associates.

The Magic 25 has a fractional rig.  It utilizes a full carbon rig, triple trapeze,  gennaker, retractable bowsprit, aluminium fin keel with a torpedo bulb, hydraulic mast ram and a powerful sail plan.

Construction

Construction is mid-tech, employing vinylester and polyester resin over an E-glass and quadraxial lay-up, with 15mm Divincell foam core and carbon reinforcement.
 
The mast was manufactured using pre-impregnated carbon fibre in a one piece mould. 
The bowsprit and tiller were also carbon fibre.

The Spinnaker is 48.4 sqm.

Specifications

Class Associations

The Magic 25 has strong class racing and associations in Australia, New Zealand and Hong Kong.

References

Sources
 Sailing Magazine
 48 North

External links
 Magic 25 Class Association of Australia
 Sportsboats Hong Kong
 Australia Trailable Yacht & Sportsboat Rule 2008

Trailer sailers
1990s sailboat type designs